The Aufgeklärtes Glück Mine is an old mine, now closed, in the valley of Thumkuhlental in the Harz Mountains of Germany. It lies southwest of Hasserode, a village on the edge of the town of Wernigerode in the state of Saxony-Anhalt. Nowadays, its exterior facilities form part of a nature and geological educational path that, thanks to the reconstruction of an old mine water management system (Wasserkunst), make a very graphic witness of the former mining activity at the foot of the Harz' highest mountain, the Brocken.

History 
The comital mining director (Bergrat), Dr Christoph Friedrich Jasche of Ilsenburg, was one of the first to investigate the mining past of this ore field. In 1846, he wrote:

The name is derived from dummen, i.e. "unfruitful" and Kuhle, an old German word for "pit". In 1929, district judge (Amtsgerichtsrat) Walther Grosse, alternatively suggested that the name gave a clue that the Halberstadt chapter (Domstift) had once exercised mining jurisdiction (Bergrechte) here. This can be confirmed, because the bishop and the cathedral chapter (Domkapitel) of Halberstadt actually appeared in the Middle Ages as the most senior mining and liege lords of Hasserode. From 1343, the liege men were the counts of Wernigerode and so the first record of this pit, as the Dhumkuhlenbergk na den Huppeln, is found in an undated deed by Count Henry of Wernigerode who died in 1429

Hiking 
The Wasserkunst Thumkuhlental is checkpoint no. 85 in the Harzer Wandernadel hiking network.

Literature 
 

Mining in the Harz
History of Saxony-Anhalt
Mining in Saxony-Anhalt
Wernigerode
Former mines in Germany